The Central District of Shahrud County is a district (bakhsh) in Shahrud County, Semnan Province, Iran. At the 2006 census, its population was 142,663, in 39,805 families.   The District has one city: Sharud. The District has three rural districts (dehestan): Dehmolla Rural District, Howmeh Rural District, and Torud Rural District.

References 

Districts of Semnan Province
Shahrud County